The 2007–08 First League of the Republika Srpska season was the thirteenth since its establishment.

Clubs and stadiums

League standings

External links
http://www.bihsoccer.com/?s=plrs_sezona_2007-2008
https://web.archive.org/web/20140819123235/http://www.fsrs.org/index.php?n=modules%2Farhiva

Bos
2
First League of the Republika Srpska seasons